is one of the eight wards of Niigata City, Niigata Prefecture, in the Hokuriku region of  Japan. , the ward had an estimated population of 161,884 in 68,119 households  and a population density of 1700 persons per km².

Geography
Nishi-ku is located in a central Niigata city, bordered by the Sea of Japan to the north. The Shinano River flow through the ward.

Surrounding municipalities
Niigata Prefecture
Chūō-ku, Niigata
Kōnan-ku, Niigata
Minami-ku, Niigata
Nishikan-ku, Niigata

History
The area of present-day Nishi-ku was part of ancient Echigo Province. It was annexed by Niigata city on January 1, 2001. Uchino was raised to town status on October 1, 1928 and was annexed by Niigata city on January 11, 1960. Niigata annexed Akatsuka and Nakanokoya on June 1, 1961. Niigata became a government-designated city on April 1, 2007 and was divided into wards, with the new Nishi Ward consisting of the former towns of Kurosaki and Uchino, and villages of Akatsuka and Nakanokoya.

Education

Universities and colleges
 Niigata University (Ikarashi Campus)
 Niigata University of International and Information Studies
Meirin College
Niigata College of Technology

Secondary schools
Nishi-ku has eight public middle schools operated by the Niigata city government. The ward has three public high schools operated by the Niigata Prefectural Board of Education, one private high school and one private combined middle/high school.

Transportation

Railway
 JR East - Echigo Line
  -  -  -  -  -  -

Transit bus
 Transit bus operated by Niigata Kotsu
 BRT "Bandai-bashi Line"
 C2 / C3
 W1 / W2 / W3 / W4 / W5 / W6 / W7 / W8

Water Shuttle
 Shinanogawa Water Shuttle:  (Minatopia) - - - (Niigata Prefectural office) - Furusato Village

Highway
 Hokuriku Expressway

Local attractions

Places
 NIIGATA FURUSATO VILLAGE
 Sakata Lagoon

Events
 Sea of Japan Sunset Concert
 Kurosaki Festival

References

External links

 Niigata official website 
 Niigata Nishi-ku website 
 Niigata City Official Tourist Information (multilingual)
 Niigata Pref. Official Travel Guide (multilingual)

Wards of Niigata (city)